One Hundred and Seven Martyrs of England and Wales, also known as Thomas Hemerford and One Hundred and Six Companion Martyrs, are a group of clergy and laypersons who were executed on charges of treason and related offences in the Kingdom of England between 1541 and 1680. 
They are considered martyrs in the Roman Catholic Church and were beatified on 15 December 1929 by Pope Pius XI.

List of individual names
They were chosen from a number of priests and laymen executed between 1584 and 1679. Their names were:

 Henry Abbot
 John Amias
 Robert Anderton
 William Andleby
 Ralph Ashley
 Thomas Aufield
 Christopher Bales
 Mark Barkworth
 William Barrow
 James Bell
 James Bird (or Byrd or Beard) 
 John Bodey
 Thomas Bosgrave
 William Browne
 Christopher Buxton
 Edward Campion (also known as Gerard Edwards)
 John Carey
 Edmund Catherick
 James Claxton (Clarkson)
 Edward Colman (or Coleman)
 Ralph Corbie
 John Cornelius
 Ralph Crockett
 Robert Dalby
 William Dean
 Francis Dicconson
 Roger Dicconson
 James Duckett
 John Duckett
 Thomas Felton
 James Fenn
 John Fenwick
 John Finch
 William Freeman
 Edward Fulthrop
 John Gavan
 Miles Gerard
 George Gervase
 David Gonson (or Gunston)
 Hugh Green 
 John Grove
 William Gunter
 William Harrington
 William Hartley
 Thomas Hemerford
 Richard Herst (Hurst)
 John Hewitt (alias Weldon, alias Savell)
 Sydney Hodgson
 Thomas Holford
 Thomas Holland
 Laurence Humphreys (or Humphrey)
 John Ingram
 John Ireland
 William Ireland
 Edward James
 Edward Jones
 Brian Lacey
 Richard Langhorne
 Richard Langley
 Richard Leigh
 John Lockwood
 William Marsden
 Richard Martin
 John Mason
 Thomas Maxfield
 Anthony Middleton
 Ralph Milner
 Hugh More
 Robert Morton
 John Munden
 George Napper (alias Napier)
 Richard Newport, (also known as Richard Smith)
 John Nutter
 Edward Oldcorne
 Francis Page
 William Patenson
 John Pibush
 Thomas Pickering
 Philip Powell
 Alexander Rawlins
 Thomas Reynolds (born Thomas Green, possible alias Richard Reynolds)
 William Richardson
 John Robinson
 John Roche
 Patrick Salmon
 Maurus Scott (William Scot)
 Edward Shelley
 John Slade
 Thomas Somers
 John Speed
 William Howard, 1st Viscount Stafford
 Edward Stransham
 Robert Sutton
 George Swallowell
 Thomas Thwing
 Thomas Tunstall
 Anthony Turner
 Thomas Warcop
 William Ward
 Edward Waterson
 Robert Watkinson
 William Way (alias May or Flower)
 Thomas Welbourne
 Thomas Whitbread
 Robert Widmerpool
 Robert Wilcox
 Peter Wright

Liturgical Feast Day
In England these martyrs, together with those beatified between 1886 and 1929, are commemorated by a feast day on 4 May. This day also honours the Forty Martyrs of England and Wales who hold the rank of saint; the Forty Martyrs were honoured separately on 25 October until the liturgical calendar for England was revised in the year 2000.

In Wales, 4 May specifically commemorates the beatified martyrs of England and Wales. Three of the martyrs named in this group of 107 – William Gunter, Edward Jones, and Philip Powell – have Welsh connections.

See also
List of Catholic martyrs of the English Reformation

References

One Hundred and Seven
English Reformation
History of Catholicism in England
Lists of Christian martyrs
Beatifications by Pope Pius XI